Stephen Darby (born 1988) is an English footballer.

Stephen Darby or Steve Darby may also refer to:
 Steve Darby (born 1955), English football coach and player
 Stephen Darby, bass player in Little Women with Jerry Joseph
 Steve Darby, former chair of the British Society for Geomorphology
 Steve Darby, a character played by John Swasey on Walker, Texas Ranger

See also
 Sir Stephen Derby (fl. 1360-1396), MP for Dorset